Angeline Moncayo (born Angelly Vanessa Moncayo on November 4, 1979) is a Colombian actress and model.

Filmography

References

External links

1979 births
Living people
Colombian telenovela actresses
Colombian television actresses
Colombian female models
Actresses from Cali
20th-century Colombian actresses
21st-century Colombian actresses
Colombian emigrants to the United States
People from Cali